Nagbavji is an Indian village. It was the location of a truck accident where 85 Hindu pilgrims were killed after a truck went down a gorge.

References

Villages in Rajasthan